The Ocheyedan River is a tributary of the Little Sioux River, 58 mi (93 km) long, in southwestern Minnesota and northwestern Iowa in the United States.  Via the Little Sioux and Missouri Rivers, it is part of the watershed of the Mississippi River.  The river has been channelized for much of its length.

Course
The Ocheyedan River flows from Ocheda Lake in Nobles County, Minnesota, 3 mi (4.8 km) south of Worthington, and flows generally southeastwardly through Osceola, O'Brien and Clay Counties in Iowa.  It joins the Little Sioux River at the town of Spencer.

In Osceola County, the river collects the short Little Ocheyedan River, which rises near Hawkeye Point (the highest elevation in Iowa) and flows southeastwardly.

See also
List of rivers of Iowa
List of rivers of Minnesota
List of longest streams of Minnesota

References

Rivers of Iowa
Rivers of Minnesota
Rivers of Clay County, Iowa
Rivers of Nobles County, Minnesota
Rivers of O'Brien County, Iowa
Rivers of Osceola County, Iowa
Dakota toponyms
Tributaries of the Mississippi River